is a retired Japanese baseball player. He played outfield for the Chunichi Dragons.

External links

NPB.jp

1990 births
Living people
Baseball people from Fukuoka Prefecture
Japanese baseball players
Chunichi Dragons players